Christ Episcopal Church was built in 1870 and is located in Bayfield, Wisconsin. It was designed in the Victorian Gothic and Carpenter Gothic architectural styles. The church was added to the National Register of Historic Places for its architectural significance in 1974. It is part of the Episcopal Diocese of Eau Claire.

References

Churches on the National Register of Historic Places in Wisconsin
Episcopal churches in Wisconsin
Carpenter Gothic church buildings in Wisconsin
Churches completed in 1870
Churches in Bayfield County, Wisconsin
19th-century Episcopal church buildings
National Register of Historic Places in Bayfield County, Wisconsin
Bayfield, Wisconsin